Morris Eugene Lukowich (born June 1, 1956) is a Canadian former professional ice hockey player. He was a member of the Winnipeg Jets of the World Hockey Association (WHA) and the National Hockey League (NHL) from 1976 to 1985, and later played for the Boston Bruins and Los Angeles Kings of the NHL. A left winger, Lukowich played in a total of 582 games over eight NHL seasons, registering a total of 199 goals and 219 assists for 418 points.

Biography
Born in Speers, Saskatchewan, Lukowich was an explosive player, both in terms of speed and scoring, though he was considered small for a professional player.

Lukowich played junior hockey with the Medicine Hat Tigers for three years. In his final season, he had a career year, scoring 65 times and accumulating 142 points in 72 games. He was selected 47th overall in the 1976 NHL Amateur Draft by the Pittsburgh Penguins, as well as the Houston Aeros in the 1976 World Hockey Association Amateur Draft, and he opted to turn pro in the WHA rather than the NHL. The opportunity to play with his idol, Gordie Howe, in Houston was the deciding factor in this decision.

After two seasons in Houston, Lukowich moved on to Winnipeg for the 1978–79 season, the last for the financially troubled WHA. Lukowich scored 65 goals and added 34 assists for 99 points, and was named as the WHA's Second Team All Star. Lukowich scored 8 goals and a team high 15 points en route to capturing the final WHA championship, the Avco Cup.

When the WHA folded in 1979, the Jets were among four of its teams absorbed by the NHL. Under the NHL's admittance terms, these teams could only protect a fraction of their roster, and Lukowich was one of the few players Winnipeg managed to retain. The early NHL years were difficult for the Jets, but Lukowich quickly emerged as the team's star, and he was appointed Winnipeg's captain for the 1980–81 season. He scored 35 and 33 goals in his first two seasons respectively, before notching his best NHL numbers in 1981–82, scoring 43 goals and 92 points. He was invited to the NHL All Star game for the second year in a row, playing on a line with Mike Bossy and Bryan Trottier.

Lukowich took a step back in 1982–83, struggling through injuries. He played in 69 games with 22 goals and 43 points. He rebounded somewhat in 1983–84, reaching the 30 goal plateau once again along with 25 assists. Early in 1984–85, Lukowich was traded to Boston in exchange for Jim Nill.

Lukowich played in 36 games over parts of two seasons with the Bruins. He was placed on waivers early in the 1985–86 season and was picked up by the Los Angeles Kings, where he finished his NHL career. He played one additional season in Italy in 1987–88 before retiring from professional hockey.

Lukowich represented Canada at the 1993 Spengler Cup Tournament, and briefly re-emerged as a roller hockey player in 1994, playing several games with RHI's Calgary Rad'z.

Personal
Morris Lukowich is the brother of curler Ed Lukowich and a cousin of hockey player Brad Lukowich. He currently resides with his wife and family in Calgary, Alberta, where he operates a hockey camp.

Career statistics

Regular season and playoffs

International

Awards
 WCHL First All-Star Team – 1976

External links

Winnipeg Jets Legends: Morris Lukowich
Morris Lukowich at Legends of Hockey
Morris Lukowich's Maximum Goal Scoring System

1956 births
Living people
Boston Bruins players
Calgary Rad'z players
Canadian ice hockey left wingers
EHC Bülach players
ECH Chur players
HC Merano players
Houston Aeros draft picks
Houston Aeros (WHA) players
Ice hockey people from Saskatchewan
Los Angeles Kings players
Medicine Hat Tigers players
Pittsburgh Penguins draft picks
SC Rapperswil-Jona Lakers players
Winnipeg Jets (1972–1996) captains
Winnipeg Jets (WHA) players
Winnipeg Jets (1979–1996) players